Dreams is a 2000 Indian Malayalam film directed by Shajoon Karyal. The film stars Suresh Gopi, Meena, Rahman and Abbas. The movie is directed by Shajoon Kariyal and produced by Kerala Pictures. The music is composed by Vidyasagar.

Plot
Nirmala Mathan (Meena) seeks vengeance for the mysterious death of her lover Shiva (Abbas). Meena suspect Dr. Roy (Suresh Gopi), who wanted to marry her. She woos him hoping to trap him in her own fabricated murder. Shiva's murder unfolds, and Dr. Roy's innocence is proven.

Cast 

 Suresh Gopi as Dr. Roy P John
 Meena as Nirmala Mathen / Anna Anthony Nediyarakala
 Rahman as SP Peter IPS
 Abbas as Shiva
 Srividya as Thankam
 Janardhanan as Thottathil Mathen, Nirmala's father
 Jagathy Sreekumar as Dr. Sugunan
 Jagadeesh as Pachathullan
 Sadiq as SI Mohammed Basheer
 Subair as Pappachan (Brother-in-law of Roy)
 Reshmi Soman as Shyama Narayanan
 Reena as Reetha
 Sindhu as Anupama P John
 Jose Pellissery
 Kazan Khan

Reception
The film was not a box office success. Karyal believes that the film is technically well-made and it did not click because he was forced to make some compromises in the climax.

Soundtrack
Music: Vidyasagar, Lyrics: Gireesh Puthenchery

References

External links
 Dreams at the Malayalam Movie Database
 
 OneIndia article

2000s Malayalam-language films
2000 crime thriller films
2000 films
2000s musical films
Films scored by Vidyasagar
Films directed by Shajoon Kariyal